The 1952 Mississippi State Maroons football team represented Mississippi State College during the 1952 college football season. It was the first season as head coach for Murray Warmath, and also for quarterback Jackie Parker, who transferred to Mississippi State from Jones County Junior College. Parker rushed for 16 touchdowns in 1952, a school record that stood until Vick Ballard broke it in 2010. Parker would win his first of two SEC "Player of the Year" honors by the Nashville Banner.

Schedule

References

Mississippi State
Mississippi State Bulldogs football seasons
Mississippi State Maroons football